The Zoom8 is a youth racing dinghy sailed in Denmark, Sweden, Norway, Finland, Austria, the Netherlands, Estonia, Latvia and Russia. It is designed by the Finn Henrik Segercrantz. The Zoom8 is considered an excellent transition dinghy from the Optimist and the more physically demanding dinghies such as the Laser, Europe and 29er, and although many attempts have been made by other classes to fill this gap, the Zoom8 dinghy is one of the few to have succeeded. 

The Swedish Zoom8 Association note that the Zoom 8 is a calm, safe boat and simple enough that beginners are able to sail it.

The Zoom8 has been spread all over Sweden since 1995 followed a few years later by Denmark and these two countries have won numerous medals in the European and World Championships.

World Champions  
 2002, Lake Balaton, Hungary –  and 
 2003, Maubuisson, France –  and 
 2004, Hoorn, Netherlands –  and 
 2005, Barth, Germany –  and 
 2006, Hundige Havn, Greve, Denmark –  and 
 2007, Lake Achen, Austria –  and 
 2008, Tønsberg, Norway –  and 
 2009, Träslövsläge, Sweden –  and

Male World Champion

Female World Champion

Manufacturers
Børresen Bådebyggeri, Vejle, Denmark
Altair Ruspol, St. Petersburg, Russia
RMT Oy, Helsinki, Finland

References

External links

 International Zoom8 Class Association
 ISAF, Classes & Equipment: Zoom8
 About 2014 Romanian Edition

Dinghies
1990s sailboat type designs
Classes of World Sailing